Meinrad I of Hohenzollern-Sigmaringen (1605 in Munich – 30 January 1681 in Sigmaringen) was  Prince of Hohenzollern-Sigmaringen from 1638 until his death.

Life 
Meinrad I was the son of Johann, Prince of Hohenzollern-Sigmaringen (1578–1638) and Countess Johanna of Hohenzollern-Hechingen (1581–1634).  The Prince was born in Munich, where his father as president acted of the Privy Council for Duke Maximilian I of Bavaria.

The Thirty Years' War had a major influence on his life.  When he was 17, he served in the Bavarian army.  He served under Tilly in the Battle of Lutter.  He later fought under Pappenheim against Protestant rebels in Austria.  He later became an influential advisor of the Duke of Bavaria.

When he inherited Hohenzollern-Sigmaringen in 1638, the principality had been ravaged and depleted by the war.  He commissioned the renowned architect Michael Beer from Vorarlberg to rebuild and modernize the castles at Sigmaringen and Haigerloch.  The Swedes had occupied Sigmaringen Castle in 1633.  In 1633, a Catholic army Under general Gustav Horn had retake the castle, however, during the battle the eastern wing had been destroyed by fire.  In 1658 and 1659, Meinrad had the east wing rebuilt and combined the two buildings on the east side, which had been built by the Counts of Werdenberg.  He paid this construction work out of his own pocket, using funds he had inherited from his father, and his wife's fortune.

He died on 30 January 1681.  After his death, the county was divided, inaccordance with the provisions of Meinrad's will: his eldest son Maximilian I inherited Hohenzollern-Sigmaringen; his youngest son Franz Anton inherited Hohenzollern-Haigerloch.

Marriage and descendants 
Meinrad married on 7 May 1635 to Anna Marie (1613 – 12 February 1682), the daughter of Baron Ferdinand of Törring at Seefeld, with whom he had nineteen children:

 Maximilian I (20 January 1636 – 13 August 1689), inherited Hohenzollern-Sigmaringen.
 Johann Karl (17 February 1637 – April 1637).
 Maria Anna (17 March 1638 – 27 August 1638).
 Franz Ferdinand (27 November 1639 – 12 August 1662), killed in a hunting accident
 Maria Johanna (28 March 1640 – 12 November 1707), Prioress of Inzigkofen Abbey.
 Meinrad (9 April 1641 – 25 April 1642).
 Christoph (born and died 26 January 1642).
 Maria Magdalena (5 January 1643 – 27 October 1663).
 Ignaz (stillborn, 22 December 1643).
 Maria Menodora (10 December 1644 – 3 December 1664), a nun in Holz.
 Maria Katharina (born and died 24 November 1645).
 Maria Theresa (20 March 1647 – June 1647).
 Johann Meinrad (9 February 1648 – 11 February 1648).
 Maria Franziska (17 May 1649 – 5 September 1712), also Prioress of Inzigkofen Abbey.
 Stillborn son (6 August 1650).
 Johann Felix (30 August 1651 – 8 September 1651).
 Anna Maria (26 August 1654 – 27 August 1678), married on 13 July 1672 to Count Anton Eusebius of Koenigsegg-Aulendorf.
 Stillborn son (22 August 1655)
 Franz Anton (2 December 1657 – 14 October 1702), inherited Hohenzollern-Haigerloch, killed in action.

Ancestry

See also 
 House of Hohenzollern

References 
 E. G. Johler: Geschichte, Land- und Ortskunde der souverainen teutschen Fürstenthümer Hohenzollern Hechingen und Sigmaringen, Stettin'sche Buchhandlung, Ulm, 1824, p. 66, Online
 Gustav Schilling: Geschichte des Hauses Hohenzollern in genealogisch fortlaufenden Biographien aller seiner Regenten von den ältesten bis auf die neuesten Zeiten, nach Urkunden und andern authentischen Quellen, Fleischer, Leipzig, 1843, p. 270 ff, online
 Günter Schmitt: Sigmaringen, in: Günter Schmitt: Burgenführer Schwäbische Alb vol. 3: Donautal. Wandern und entdecken zwischen Sigmaringen und Tuttlingen, Biberacher Verlagsdruckerei, Biberach, 1990, p. 41-62

External links 
 Family tree at the site of the Prince of Hohenzollern company

Princes of Hohenzollern-Sigmaringen
Counts of Hohenzollern-Haigerloch
House of Hohenzollern
1605 births
1681 deaths
17th-century German people
Nobility from Munich